The Bidwell Marriott Portland, is a hotel located at 520 Southwest Broadway in Portland, Oregon, United States. 

Construction on the Portland Marriott City Center began in 1996 and the hotel opened in 1999. It closed for renovations in 2020 and reopened in 2021 as The Bidwell Marriott Portland.

See also
 List of Marriott hotels

References

External links
 
 The Bidwell Marriott Portland official website

1999 establishments in Oregon
Buildings and structures completed in 1999
Hotels in Portland, Oregon
Marriott hotels
Southwest Portland, Oregon
Hotels established in 1999
Hotel buildings completed in 1999